Salt, Sun and Time is the fifth full-length album by Canadian singer-songwriter and guitarist Bruce Cockburn; released in late 1974 on True North Records.  The album was recorded in Toronto, Ontario at Thunder Sound studio between May and August 1974; except the songs "Salt, Sun and Time" and "Rouler Sa Bosse" which were mixed at Manta Sound with Leo DeCarlo. "Salt, Sun and Time" and "Rouler Sa Bosse" were included on Cockburn's 2005 instrumental album Speechless.

Reception

Allmusic music critic James Chrispell, wrote retrospectively "There's a much more complex feel to what's here, especially the instrumental title track which shows a strong John Martyn influence. And while the songs are complex in texture and feel, they aren't hard to get into. In fact, this album grows on you the more you play it. Truly something that has endured."

Track listing
All songs written by Bruce Cockburn except where noted.
"All the Diamonds in the World" – 2:42
"Salt, Sun and Time" – 3:10
"Don't Have to Tell You Why" – 4:33
"Stained Glass" – 3:14
"Rouler Sa Bosse" – 3:47
"Never So Free" – 4:01
"Seeds on the Wind" (Bruce Cockburn, Eugene Martynec) – 7:04
"It Won't Be Long" – 3:48
"Christmas Song" – 3:53

Personnel
Bruce Cockburn – guitar, composer, vocals
Gene Martynec – synthesizer, guitar, producer
Jack Zaza – clarinet
Production:
Bruce Anthony – producer
Bill Seddon – engineer
Vic Anesini – mastering
Leo DeCarlo – mixing
Lyle Wachovsky – photography
Marcel Moussette – translation
Bernie Finkelstein – direction

References

1974 albums
Bruce Cockburn albums
Albums produced by Gene Martynec
True North Records albums